The Norwich City F.C. Hall of Fame honours Norwich City F.C. players, coaches, managers, directors and executives who have "made the greatest contribution to the club in its long history both on and off the pitch." During the club's centenary season (2002–03), a Hall of Fame was created. Initially, 100 significant figures from the club's history were honoured; 25 were nominated by the Norwich City Football Club Historical Trust and a further 75 were subsequently elected by supporters. A further 20 members were inducted in 2006 and 2009, again with some chosen by the Trust and some elected by supporters. In 2012, another eight members were selected, three by the Norwich City Football Club Historical Trust and five elected by supporters.

Six members of the Hall of Fame both played for and managed or coached at the club, most recently Gary Megson and Doug Livermore, respectively. Mike Walker is the only manager in the list to have had two spells as City manager.

List of members
Below is a sortable list of the inductees, indicating members who have also won the club's Player of the Season award since its inception in 1967.

"Type" refers to the type of admission to the Hall of Fame.
 Inaugural: One of 25 people nominated by the Norwich City Football Club Historical Trust in 2003 as inaugural members
 2003: One of 75 people admitted to the Hall of Fame in 2003 having been elected by supporters as inaugural members
 2006: One of 10 additional people admitted to the Hall of Fame in 2006
 2009: One of 10 additional people admitted to the Hall of Fame in 2009
2012: One of 8 additional people admitted to the Hall of Fame in 2012

Members by position

Members by nationality

References

External links
Hall of Fame page (Norwich City F.C. official website)

Hall
Lists of association football players by club in England
Association football museums and halls of fame
Halls of fame in England
Sports hall of fame inductees
Awards established in 2003
2003 establishments in England
Association football player non-biographical articles